Nelson B. Bartram (January 7, 1832 - December 25, 1886) was a teacher, vice-principal, and colonel in the U.S. Army who commanded United States Colored Troops during the American Civil War. The Library of Congress has an albumen print photograph of him. After the war he served as a clerk and then deputy collector at a Customs House in New York.

Bartram was born in Westport, New York. He married Annie Van Dyke in 1857. They had six children. A statue of him by John Massey Rhind stands in Port Chester, New York.

His unit trained on Riker's Island. When it debuted in New York City it was a celebrated event covered by the New York Times. The Times noted the event followed the New York City draft riots when public buildings, leaders, and African Americans in the city were attacked.

References

1832 births
1886 deaths
People from Westport, New York
People of New York (state) in the American Civil War
African Americans in the American Civil War
Union Army colonels
Schoolteachers from New York (state)
American school administrators
19th-century American educators
African-American schoolteachers